The 2015–16 LEN Women's Champions' Cup was the 29th edition of LEN's premier competition for women's water polo clubs.

Final four

Squads
The final four squads were  Kinef Kirishi, Olympiacos, CN Sabadell and UVSE Budapest.

Kinef Kirishi

Olympiacos

CN Sabadell

UVSE Budapest

References

LEN Euro League Women seasons
Women, Euro League
2015 in water polo
2016 in water polo
LEN
LEN